The  history of the Jews in Belarus begins as early as the 8th century. Jews lived in all parts of the lands of modern Belarus. Jews were the third largest ethnic group in the country in the first half of the 20th century. In 1897, the Jewish population of Belarus reached 910,900, or 14.2% of the total population.  Following the Polish-Soviet War (1919-1920), under the terms of the Treaty of Riga, Belarus was split into Eastern Belorussia (under Soviet occupation) and Western Belorussia (under Polish occupation),  and causing 350,000-450,000 of the Jews to be governed by Poland.  Prior to World War II, Jews remained the third largest ethnic group in Belarus and comprised more than 40% of the population in cities and towns. The population of cities such as Minsk, Pinsk, Mahiliou, Babrujsk, Viciebsk, and Homiel was more than 50% Jewish. In 1926 and 1939 there were between 375,000 and 407,000 Jews in Belarus (Eastern Belorussia) or 6.7-8.2% of the total population.  Following the Soviet annexation of Eastern Poland in 1939, including Western Belorussia, Belarus would again have 1,175,000 Jews within its borders, including 275,000 Jews from Poland, Ukraine, and elsewhere. It is estimated 800,000 of 900,000 — 90% of the Jews of Belarus —were killed during the Holocaust.  According to the 2019 national census, there were 13,705 self-identifying Jews in Belarus. The Jewish Agency estimates the community of Jews in Belarus at 20,000. However, the number of Belarusians with Jewish descent is assumed to be higher.

Early history
Throughout several centuries the lands of modern Belarus and the Republic of Lithuania were both parts of the Grand Duchy of Lithuania. Therefore, the history of Belarusian Jews is closely related to the history of Jews in Lithuania and historically they could be seen as a subset of Lithuanian Jews.

As early as the 8th century Jews lived in parts of the lands of modern Belarus. Beginning with that period they conducted the trade between Ruthenia, Lithuania, and the Baltic, especially with Danzig, Julin (Vineta or Wollin, in Pomerania), and other cities on the Vistula, Oder, and Elbe.

The origin of Belarusian Jews has been the subject of much speculation. It is believed that they were made up of two distinct streams of Jewish immigration. The older and significantly smaller of the two entered the territory that would later become the Grand Duchy of Lithuania from the east. These early immigrants spoke Judeo-Slavic dialects which distinguished them from the later Jewish immigrants who entered the region from the Germanic lands.

While the origin of these eastern Jews is not certain, historical evidence places Jewish refugees from Babylonia, Palestine, the Byzantine Empire and other Jewish refugees and settlers in the lands between the Baltic and Black Seas that would become part of the Grand Duchy of Lithuania. The later and much larger stream of immigration originated in the 12th century and received an impetus from the persecution of the German Jews by the Crusaders. The traditional language of the vast majority of Lithuanian Jews, Yiddish, is based largely upon the Medieval German and Hebrew spoken by the western Germanic Jewish immigrants.

The peculiar conditions that prevailed in Belarus compelled the first Jewish settlers to adopt a different mode of life from that followed by their western ethnic brethren. At that time there were no cities in the western sense of the word in Belarus, no Magdeburg Rights or close guilds at that time.

Some of the cities which later became the important centers of Jewish life in Belarus were at first mere villages. Hrodna, one of the oldest, was first mentioned in the chronicles of 1128. Navahrudak was founded somewhat later by Yaroslav I the Wise; Kerlov in 1250; Voruta and Twiremet in 1252; Eiragola in 1262; Halshany and Kowno in 1280; Lida, Telšiai, Vilna and Troki in 1320.

Increasing prosperity and the great charter (1320–1432)
With the campaign of Hiedzimin and his subjection of Kiev and Volhynia (1320–1321) the Jewish inhabitants of these territories were induced to spread throughout the northern provinces of the Grand Duchy of Lithuania. The probable importance of the southern Jews in the development of Belarus and Lithuania is indicated by their numerical prominence in Volhynia in the 13th century. According to an annalist who describes the funeral of the grand duke Vladimir Vasilkovich in the city of Vladimir (Volhynia), "the Jews wept at his funeral as at the fall of Jerusalem, or when being led into the Babylonian captivity." This sympathy and the record thereof would seem to indicate that long before the event in question the Jews had enjoyed considerable prosperity and influence, and this gave them a certain standing under the new régime. They took an active part in the development of the new cities under the tolerant rule of duke Hiedzimin.

Little is known of the fortunes of the Belarusian Jews during the troublous times that followed the death of Hiedzimin and the accession of his grandson Vitaut (1341). To the latter, the Jews owed a charter of privileges which was momentous in the subsequent history of the Jews of Belarus and Lithuania. The documents granting privileges first to the Jews of Brest (July 1, 1388) and later to those of Hrodna, Troki (1389), Lutsk, Vladimir, and other large towns are the earliest documents to recognize the Jews of the Grand Duchy of Lithuania as possessing a distinct organization.

The gathering together of the scattered Jewish settlers in sufficient numbers and with enough power to form such an organization and to obtain privileges from their Lithuanian rulers implies the lapse of considerable time. The Jews who dwelt in smaller towns and villages were not in need of such privileges at this time, and the mode of life, as Abraham Harkavy suggests, "the comparative poverty, and the ignorance of Jewish learning among the Lithuanian Jews retarded their intercommunal organization." But powerful forces hastened this organization toward the close of the 14th century. The chief of these was probably the cooperation of the Jews of Poland with their brethren in the GDL. After the death of Casimir III (1370), the condition of the Polish Jews changed for the worse. The influence of the Roman Catholic clergy at the Polish court grew; Louis of Anjou was indifferent to the welfare of his subjects, and his eagerness to convert the Jews to Christianity, together with the increased Jewish immigration from Germany, caused the Polish Jews to become apprehensive for their future.

The Charter of 1388
On this account it seems more than likely that influential Polish Jews cooperated with the leading Belarusian and Lithuanian communities in securing a special charter from Vitaut (Witold). The preamble of the charter reads as follows:

In the name of God, Amen. All deeds of men, when they are not made known by the testimony of witnesses or in writing, pass away and vanish and are forgotten. Therefore, we, Alexander, also called Vitovt, by the grace of God Grand Duke of Lithuania and ruler of Brest, Dorogicz, Lutsk, Vladimir, and other places, make known by this charter to the present and future generations, or to whomever it may concern to know or hear of it, that, after due deliberation with our nobles we have decided to grant to all the Jews living in our domains the rights and liberties mentioned in the following charter.

The charter itself was modeled upon similar documents granted by Casimir the Great, and earlier by Boleslaw of Kalisz, to the Jews in Poland in 1084. Under the charter, the Jews of the Grand Duchy of Lithuania formed a class of freemen subject in all criminal cases directly to the jurisdiction of the grand duke and his official representatives, and in petty suits to the jurisdiction of local officials on an equal footing with the lesser nobles (szlachta), boyars, and other free citizens. The official representatives of the grand duke were the elder (starosta), known as the "Jewish judge" (judex Judæorum), and his deputy. The Jewish judge decided all cases between Christians and Jews and all criminal suits in which Jews were concerned; in civil suits, however, he acted only on the application of the interested parties. Either party who failed to obey the judge's summons had to pay him a fine. To him also belonged all fines collected from Jews for minor offenses. His duties included the guardianship of the persons, property, and freedom of worship of the Jews. He had no right to summon any one to his court except upon the complaint of an interested party. In matters of religion the Jews were given extensive autonomy.

Under these equitable laws the Jews of Belarus and Lithuania reached a degree of prosperity unknown to their Polish and German co-religionists at that time. The communities of Brest, Hrodna, Minsk, Troki and Lutsk rapidly grew in wealth and influence. Every community had at its head a Jewish elder. These elders represented the communities in all external relations, in securing new privileges, and in the regulation of taxes. Such officials are not, however, referred to by the title "elder" before the end of the 16th century. Up to that time the documents merely state, for instance, that the "Jews of Brest humbly apply," etc. On assuming office the elders declared under oath that they would discharge the duties of the position faithfully, and would relinquish the office at the expiration of the appointed term. The elder acted in conjunction with the rabbi, whose jurisdiction included all Jewish affairs with the exception of judicial cases assigned to the court of the deputy, and by the latter to the king. In religious affairs, however, an appeal from the decision of the rabbi and the elder was permitted only to a council consisting of the chief rabbis of the king's cities. The cantor, sexton, and shochet were subject to the orders of the rabbi and elder.

The goodwill and tolerance of Vitaut endeared him to his Jewish subjects, and for a long time traditions concerning his generosity and nobility of character were current among them. His cousin, the king of Poland Jagiello, did not interfere with his administration during Vitaut's lifetime.

Jagiellon rule
In 1569 Poland and the Grand Duchy of Lithuania were united. It was generally a time of prosperity and relative safety for the Jews of both countries (with the exception of the Chmielnicki Uprising in the 17th century). However, a few events, such as the expulsion of the Jews from the Grand Duchy of Lithuania between 1495 and 1503 occurred just within the Grand Duchy.

Expulsion of the Jews in 1495 and return in 1503
Casimir was succeeded as king of Poland by his son John Albert, and on the Lithuanian throne by his younger son, Alexander Jagellon. The latter confirmed the charter of privileges granted to the Jews by his predecessors, and even gave them additional rights. His father's Jewish creditors received part of the sums due to them, the rest being withheld under various pretexts. The attitude toward the Jews which had characterized the Lithuanian rulers for generations was unexpectedly and radically changed by a decree promulgated by Alexander in April, 1495. By this decree all Jews living in Lithuania proper and the adjacent territories were summarily ordered to leave the country.

The expulsion was evidently not accompanied by the usual cruelties; for there was no popular animosity toward the Jews, and the decree was regarded as an act of mere willfulness on the part of an absolute ruler. Some of the nobility, however, approved Alexander's decree, expecting to profit by the departure of their Jewish creditors, as is indicated by numerous lawsuits on the return of the exiles to Lithuania in 1503. It is known from the Hebrew sources that some of the exiles migrated to the Crimea, and that by far the greater number settled in Poland, where, by permission of King John Albert, they established themselves in the towns situated near the boundary of the Grand Duchy of Lithuania. This permission, given at first for a period of two years, was extended "because of the extreme poverty of the Jews on account of the great losses sustained by them." The extension, which applied to all the towns of the kingdom, accorded the enjoyment of all the liberties that had been granted to their Polish brethren (Kraków, June 29, 1498). The expelled Karaites settled in the Polish town of Ratno.

The causes of the unexpected expulsion were probably many, including religious reasons, the need to fill a depleted treasury by confiscating the Jews' money, personal animosity, and other causes.

Soon after Alexander's accession to the throne of Poland he permitted the Jewish exiles to return to Lithuania. Beginning in March, 1503, as is shown by documents still extant, their houses, lands, synagogues, and cemeteries were returned to them, and permission was granted them to collect their old debts. The new charter of privileges permitted them to live throughout Lithuania as before. The return of the Jews and their attempt to regain their old possessions led to many difficulties and lawsuits. Alexander found it necessary to issue an additional decree (April, 1503), directing his vice-regent to enforce the law. In spite of this some of the property was not recovered by the Jews for years.

The Act of 1566
The middle of the 16th century witnessed a growing antagonism between the lesser nobility and the Jews. Their relations became strained, and the enmity of the Christians began to disturb the life of the Litvak Jews. The anti-Jewish feeling, due at first to economic causes engendered by competition, was fostered by the clergy, who were then engaged in a crusade against "heretics," notably the Lutherans, Calvinists, and Jews. The Reformation, which had spread from Germany, tended to weaken the allegiance to the Roman Catholic Church. Frequent instances occurred of the marriage of Catholic women to Jews, Turks, or Tatars. The Bishop of Wilno (Vilnius) complained to Sigismund August (Dec., 1548) of the frequency of such mixed marriages and of the education of the offspring in their fathers' faiths. The szlachta also saw in the Jews dangerous competitors in commercial and financial undertakings. In their dealings with the agricultural classes the lords preferred the Jews as middlemen, thus creating a feeling of injury on the part of the szlachta. The exemption of the Jews from military service and the power and wealth of the Jewish tax-farmers intensified the resentment of the szlachta. Members of the nobility, like Bardzo bogaty, Ród Zagórowskich, (Strzemie coat of arms) and others, attempted to compete with the Jews as leaseholders of customs revenues, but were never successful. Since the Jews lived in the towns and on the lands of the king, the nobility could not wield any authority over them nor derive profit from them. They had not even the right to settle Jews on their estates without the permission of the king; but, on the other hand, they were often annoyed by the erection on their estates of the tollhouses of the Jewish tax-collectors.

Hence when the strategic moment arrived, the Lithuanian nobility endeavored to secure greater power over the Jews. At the Diet of Vilna in 1551 the nobility urged the imposition of a special polltax of one ducat per head, and the Volhynian nobles demanded that the Jewish tax-collectors be forbidden to erect tollhouses or place guards at the taverns on their estates.

The opposition to the Jews was finally crystallized and found definite expression in the repressive Lithuanian statute of 1566, when the nobles of Belarus and Lithuania were first allowed to take part in the national legislation. Paragraph Twelve of this statute contains the following articles:

"The Jews shall not wear costly clothing, nor gold chains, nor shall their wives wear gold or silver ornaments. The Jews shall not have silver mountings on their sabers and daggers; they shall be distinguished by characteristic clothes; they shall wear yellow caps, and their wives kerchiefs of yellow linen, in order that all may be enabled to distinguish Jews from Christians."

Other restrictions of a similar nature are contained in the same paragraph. However, the king checked the desire of the nobility to modify essentially the old charters of the Jews.

Effect of the Cossacks' Uprising in Belarus

The fury of the 1648–1657 Cossack rebellion in the Polish–Lithuanian Commonwealth destroyed the organization of the Jewish communities in Belarus. The survivors who returned to their old homes in the latter half of the 17th century were practically destitute. The wars which raged constantly in the Lithuanian territory brought ruin to the entire country and deprived the Jews of the opportunity to earn more than a bare livelihood. The intensity of their struggle for existence left them no time to reestablish the conditions which had existed up to 1648. John Casimir (1648–1668) sought to ameliorate their condition by granting various concessions to the Jewish communities of Lithuania. Attempts to return to the old order in the communal organization were not wanting, as is evident from contemporary documents. Thus in 1672, Jewish elders from various towns and villages in the Grand Duchy of Lithuania secured a charter from King Michał Korybut Wiśniowiecki (1669–1673), decreeing "that on account of the increasing number of Jews guilty of offenses against the Szlachta and other Christians, which result in the enmity of the Christians toward the Jews, and because of the inability of the Jewish elders to punish such offenders, who are protected by the lords, the king permits the kahals to summon the criminals before the Jewish courts for punishment and exclusion from the community when necessary." The efforts to resurrect the old power of the kahals were not successful. The impoverished Jewish merchants, having no capital of their own, were compelled to borrow money from the nobility, from churches, congregations, monasteries, and various religious orders. Loans from the latter were usually for an unlimited period and were secured by mortgages on the real estate of the kahal. The kahals thus became hopelessly indebted to the clergy and the nobility.

In 1792 the Jewish population of the Grand Duchy of Lithuania was estimated at 250,000 (as compared with 120,000 in 1569). The whole of the commerce and industries of the country, now rapidly declining, was in the hands of the Jews. The nobility lived for the most part on their estates and farms, some of which were managed by Jewish leaseholders. The city properties were concentrated in the possession of monasteries, churches, and the lesser nobility. The Christian merchants were poor. Such was the condition of affairs in Belarus at the time of the second partition of Poland (1793), when the Jews became subjects of Russia.

Jewish culture in Belarus
The founding of the yeshivas in Belarus was due to the Lithuanian-Polish Jews who studied in the west, and to the German Jews who migrated about that time to Belarus, Lithuania and Poland. Very little is known of these early yeshivas. No mention is made of them or of prominent Lithuanian rabbis in Jewish writings until the 16th century. The first known rabbinical authority and head of a yeshiva was Isaac Bezaleel of Vladimir, Volhynia, who was already an old man when Solomon Luria went to Ostrog in the fourth decade of the 16th century. Another rabbinical authority, Kalman Haberkaster, rabbi of Ostrog and predecessor of Luria, died in 1559. Occasional references to the yeshiva of Brest are found in the writings of the contemporary rabbis Solomon Luria (d. 1585), Moses Isserles (d. 1572), and David Gans (d. 1589), who speak of its activity. Of the yeshiva of Ostrog and Vladimir in Volhynia it is known that they were in a flourishing condition at the middle of the 16th century, and that their heads vied with one another in Talmudic scholarship. Mention is also made by Gans of the head of the Kremenetz yeshiva, Isaac Cohen (d. 1573), of whom but little is known otherwise.

At the time of the Lublin Union, Solomon Luria was rabbi of Ostrog, and was regarded as one of the greatest Talmudic authorities in Poland and the GDL. In 1568 King Sigismund ordered that the suits between Isaac Borodavka and Mendel Isakovich, who were partners in the farming of certain customs taxes in the Grand Duchy of Lithuania, be carried for decision to Rabbi Solomon Luria and two auxiliary rabbis from Pinsk and Tiktin.

The far-reaching authority of the leading rabbis of Poland and Lithuania, and their wide knowledge of practical life, are apparent from numerous decisions cited in the responsa. They were always the champions of justice and morality. In the Eitan ha-Ezrachi (Ostrog, 1796) of Abraham Rapoport (known also as Abraham Schrenzel; d. 1650), Rabbi Meïr Sack is cited as follows: "I emphatically protest against the custom of our communal leaders of purchasing the freedom of Jewish criminals. Such a policy encourages crime among our people. I am especially troubled by the fact that, thanks to the clergy, such criminals may escape punishment by adopting Christianity. Mistaken piety impels our leaders to bribe the officials, in order to prevent such conversions. We should endeavor to deprive criminals of opportunities to escape justice." The same sentiment was expressed in the 16th century by Maharam Lublin (Responsa, § 138). Another instance, cited by Katz from the same responsa, likewise shows that Jewish criminals invoked the aid of priests against the authority of Jewish courts by promising to become converts to Christianity.

The decisions of the Polish-Lithuanian rabbis are frequently marked by breadth of view also, as is instanced by a decision of Joel Sirkes (Bayis Hadash, § 127) to the effect that Jews may employ in their religious services the melodies used in Christian churches, "since music is neither Jewish nor Christian, and is governed by universal laws."

Decisions by Luria, Meïr Katz, and Mordecai Jaffe show that the rabbis were acquainted with the Russian language and its philology. Jaffe, for instance, in a divorce case where the spelling of the woman's name as Lupka or Lubka was in question, decided that the word is correctly spelled with a "b," and not with a "p," since the origin of the name was the Russian verb  = "to love," and not  = "to beat" (Levush ha-Butz we-Argaman, § 129). Meïr Katz (Geburat Anashim, § 1) explains that the name of Brest-Litovsk is written in divorce cases "Brest" and not "Brisk," "because the majority of the Lithuanian Jews use the Russian language." It is not so with Brisk, in the district of Kujawa, the name of that town being always spelled "Brisk." Katz (a German) at the conclusion of his responsum expresses the hope that when Lithuania shall have become more enlightened, the people will speak one language only—German—and that also Brest-Litovsk will be written "Brisk."

Items from the Responsa
The responsa shed an interesting light also on the life of the Lithuanian Jews and on their relations to their Christian neighbors. Benjamin Aaron Solnik states in his Mas'at Binyamin (end of sixteenth and beginning of 17th century) that "the Christians borrow clothes and jewelry from the Jews when they go to church." Sirkes (l.c. § 79) relates that a Christian woman came to the rabbi and expressed her regret at having been unable to save the Jew Shlioma from drowning. A number of Christians had looked on indifferently while the drowning Jew was struggling in the water. They were upbraided and beaten severely by the priest, who appeared a few minutes later, for having failed to rescue the Jew.

Luria gives an account (Responsa, § 20) of a quarrel that occurred in a Lithuanian community concerning a cantor whom some of the members wished to dismiss. The synagogue was closed in order to prevent him from exercising his functions, and religious services were thus discontinued for several days. The matter was thereupon carried to the local lord, who ordered the reopening of the building, saying that the house of God might not be closed, and that the cantor's claims should be decided by the learned rabbis of Lithuania. Joseph Katz mentions (She'erit Yosef, § 70) a Jewish community which was forbidden by the local authorities to kill cattle and to sell meat—an occupation which provided a livelihood for a large portion of the Lithuanian Jews. For the period of a year following this prohibition the Jewish community was on several occasions assessed at the rate of three gulden per head of cattle in order to furnish funds with which to induce the officials to grant a hearing of the case. The Jews finally reached an agreement with the town magistrates under which they were to pay forty gulden annually for the right to slaughter cattle. According to Hillel ben Herz (Bet Hillel, Yoreh De'ah, § 157), Naphtali says the Jews of Vilna had been compelled to uncover when taking an oath in court, but later purchased from the tribunal the privilege to swear with covered head, a practise subsequently made unnecessary by a decision of one of their rabbis to the effect that an oath might be taken with uncovered head.

The responsa of Meïr Lublin show (§ 40) that the Lithuanian communities frequently aided the German and the Austrian Jews. On the expulsion of the Jews from Silesia, when the Jewish inhabitants of Silz had the privilege of remaining on condition that they would pay the sum of 2,000 gulden, the Lithuanian communities contributed one-fifth of the amount.

Belarusian Jews under the Russian Empire

Upon annexation of Belarusian lands, Russian czars included the territory into the so-called Pale of Settlement, a western border region of Imperial Russia in which the permanent residence of Jews was allowed. Though comprising only 20% of the territory of European Russia, the Pale corresponded to the historical borders of the Polish–Lithuanian Commonwealth and included much of present-day Belarus, Republic of Lithuania, Poland, Moldova, Ukraine, and parts of western Russia.

By the end of the 19th century, many Belarusian Jews were part of the general flight of Jews from Eastern Europe to the New World due to conflicts and pogroms engulfing the Russian Empire and the anti-Semitism of the Russian czars.  Millions of Jews, including tens of thousands of Jews from Belarus, emigrated to the United States of America and South Africa. A small number also emigrated to the British Mandate of Palestine.

After the October Revolution
Jewish political organizations, including the General Jewish Labour Bund, participated in the creation of the Belarusian People's Republic in 1918.

During the first years of Soviet power in Belarus, in the 1920s, Yiddish was an official language in East Belarus along with Belarusian, Polish and Russian. Yakov Gamarnik, a Ukrainian Jew, was First Secretary of the Communist Party of Belorussia (i.e. the de facto head of state) from December 1928 to October 1929. However, the Soviet policy later turned against the Jews (see Stalin's antisemitism).

World War II

Atrocities against the Jewish population in the German-conquered areas began almost immediately, with the dispatch of Einsatzgruppen (task groups) to round up Jews and shoot them. Local anti-semites were encouraged to carry out their own pogroms. By the end of 1941, there were more than 5,000 troops devoted to rounding up and killing Jews. The gradual industrialization of killing led to adoption of the Final Solution and the establishment of the Operation Reinhard extermination camps: the machinery of the Holocaust. Of the Soviet Jews who were killed in the Holocaust, 246,000 Jews were Belarusian: some 66% of the total number of Belarusian Jews.

Late 20th century to modern days

In 1968, several thousand Jewish youths were arrested for Zionist activity. In the second half of the 20th century, there was a large wave of Belarusian Jews immigrating to Israel (see Aliyah from the Soviet Union in the 1970s), as well as to the United States. In 1979, there were 135,400 Jews in Belarus; a decade later, 112,000 were left. The collapse of the Soviet Union and Belarusian independence saw most of the community, along with the majority of the former Soviet Union's Jewish population, leave for Israel (see Russian immigration to Israel in the 1990s).

The 1999 census estimated that there were only 27,798 Jews left in the country, which further declined to 12,926 in 2009 and marginally rose to 13,705 in 2019, although oddly in that year, 10,269 men but only 3,436 women identified as Jewish. However, local Jewish organizations put the number at 50,000 in 2006. About half of the country's Jews live in Minsk. National Jewish organizations, local cultural groups, religious schools, charitable organizations, and organizations for war veterans and Holocaust survivors have been formed.

Since the mass immigration of the 1990s, there has been some continuous immigration to Israel. In 2002, 974 Belarusians moved to Israel, and between 2003 and 2005, 4,854 followed suit.

See also

List of Belarusian Jews
Timeline of Jewish history in Lithuania and Belarus
History of the Jews in Poland
Lithuanian Jews
History of the Jews during World War II
Gavriil of Belostok
Hasidic Judaism
Mir yeshiva (Belarus)
Belarus–Israel relations

References

Further reading

External links
 Андрэй Шуман. Ашкеназскія габрэі як адзін з карэнных народаў Беларусі (Andrew Schumann. Ashkenazi Jews as one of the indigenous people of Belarus)
 Иудейская Беларусь: из прошлого в настоящее, Interview with Jakau Hutman (Yakov Gutman) chairman of the World Association of Belarusian Jewry; English Translation
Union of Belarusian expatriates to Israel
Antisemitism in Twenty-First Century Europe
Belarusian Cemetery Index
Holocaust of the Soviet Jewry
A Demographic Profile of the Jews in Belorussia, 1939–1959
Shtetlinks
Brit Hadasha - Messianic Jewish Congregation in Minsk.
Jewish Outreach in Belarus. Travel Services and Record Searches
Chabad-Lubavitch Centers in Belarus
Recollections of Those Rescued by the Bielski Partisans and Survived the Holocaust from Lida, Belarus Lida Memorial Society Homepage Stories and Pictures
Jewish Belarus
 Belarus SIG at JewishGen